P. Sreekumar is an Indian actor, scriptwriter, director and producer who appears in Malayalam movies. He has acted in more than 150 Malayalam films. Presently he is serving as the Chairman of Kerala Cultural Activists Welfare Fund Board.

Background
P. Sreekumar was born on 9 March 1944, as the son of Parameshwaran Nair and Parukuttiyamma at Thiruvananthapuram. He made his debut through Kannur Deluxe a Malayalam movie in 1968. He had two younger brothers named Dilip Kumar, Prem Kumar and sisters Prabha, Shoba and Sandhya. He was a former employee of Kerala State Road Transport Corporation.

Family
He is married to S.Vasantha. The couple has two children, Chinthu Sreekumar and Devi.

Awards
 2003 - Kerala State Film Award (Special Jury Award) - Paadam Onnu: Oru Vilapam

Selected filmography

As an actor

 Kannoor Deluxe (1969) as K R Radha
 Nazhikakallu (1970)
 Seetha (1980)
 Swarnnappakshikal (1981)
 Odaruthammava Aalariyam (1984)
 Susanna (2000)
 Pilots (2000)
 Cover Story (2000)
 Ente Hridayathinte Udama (2002)
 Sesham (2002)
 Dany (2002)
 Margam (2003)
 Achuvinte Amma (2005)
 Bada Dosth (2006) as Pilla
 Nottam (2006)
 Rappakal (2005)
 Nerariyan CBI (2005)
 Krithyam (2005)
 Rasathanthram (2006)
 Lion (2006)
 Babakalyani (2006)
 Raashtram (2006)
 Mayavi (2007)
 Avan Chandiyude Makan (2007) as Soman Pilla
 Chocolate (2007)
 Nasrani (2007)
 AKG (2007)
 Paranju Theeratha Visheshangal (2007) 
 Naalu Pennungal (2007)
 Flash (2007)
 Minnaminnikoottam (2008) as Abhi's father 
 Musafir (2013)
 Samastha Keralam PO (2009)
 Hailesa (2009)
 Bhagyadevatha (2009)
 Kutty Srank (2010)
 Pramani (2010)
 Sadgamaya (2010)
 Elektra (2010)
 Neelambari (2010)
 Sakudumbam Shyamala (2010)
 Mohabbath (2011)
 Manikiakkallu (2011)
 The King & The Commissioner (2012)
 Sandwich (2011)
 Perinoru Makan (2012)
 Simhasanam (2012)
 Lisammayude Veedu (2012)
 Theevram (2012)
 Chettayees (2012)
 Rebecca Uthup Kizhakkemala (2013)
 Progress Report (2013)
 Swapaanam (2013)
 Drishyam (2013)
 Ettekaal Second (2014)
 Ammakkoru Tharattu (2015)
 Fireman (2015)
 Njan Samvidhanam Cheyyum (2015)
 Oolu (2019)

As a Director
 Kayyum Thalayum Purathidaruthu (1985) 
 Asthikal Pookkunnu (1989) 
  Vishnu (1994 film)

As an Assistant Director
 Anantaram (1987)

Screenplay
 Asthikal Pookkunnu (1989)

Dialogue
 Asthikal Pookkunnu (1989)

Story
 Asthikal Pookkunnu (1989)
 Kalippaattam (1993)

Television serials
 Manasu Parayunna Karyangal (Mazhavil Manorama)
Kadamattathu kathanar (Asianet)
Ente Manasaputhri (Asianet)
Kanalpoovu (Jeevan TV)
Namukku Paarkkuvan Munthirithoppukal (Surya TV)

References

External links

http://entertainment.oneindia.in/celebs/p-sreekumar/filmography.html
https://web.archive.org/web/20140201174349/http://www.metromatinee.com/artist/P.Sreekumar-435
http://www.malayalachalachithram.com/profiles.php?i=2266
P. Sreekumar at MSI
Asthikal Pookkunnu

Indian male film actors
Male actors from Thiruvananthapuram
Male actors in Malayalam cinema
Living people
Malayalam film directors
Film directors from Thiruvananthapuram
20th-century Indian male actors
21st-century Indian male actors
20th-century Indian film directors
1944 births